Jasmina Immaeva is an Uzbekistani freestyle wrestler. She won the silver medal in the 50kg event at the 2021 Islamic Solidarity Games held in Konya, Turkey. She is also a two-time medalist at the Asian Wrestling Championships.

She won the silver medal in her event at the 2021 Asian Wrestling Championships held in Almaty, Kazakhstan. She won the bronze medal in her event at the 2022 Asian Wrestling Championships held in Ulaanbaatar, Mongolia. She competed in the 50kg event at the 2022 World Wrestling Championships held in Belgrade, Serbia.

Achievements

References

External links 

 

Living people
Year of birth missing (living people)
Place of birth missing (living people)
Uzbekistani female sport wrestlers
Asian Wrestling Championships medalists
Islamic Solidarity Games medalists in wrestling
Islamic Solidarity Games competitors for Uzbekistan
21st-century Uzbekistani women